Sandy the Reluctant Nudist, also known as The Reluctant Nudist and Sandy the Reluctant Nature Girl, is a nudist film from England which was produced by Michael Deeley. His girlfriend wrote the script and his mother did continuity.

Premise
Sandy is an 18-year-old girl who discovers her boyfriend David is a nudist.

Cast
Annette Briand as Sandy
Jeremy Howes as David
Vivienne Taylor as Bridget
Peter Benison as Allan
John Atkinson as Detective
Mary Chapman as Mrs. Schofield
Constance Feeher as Mrs. Henderson
Bertha Russell as Mrs. Dearlove

Release
The film was made in 1963 but was not released until 1966.

References

External links

British comedy films
1960s English-language films